The National Communication Association (NCA) is a not-for-profit association of academics in the field of communication.

Organization 

NCA is governed by the Legislative Assembly, which meets during the NCA Annual Convention. Between annual meetings of the Legislative Assembly, the association is governed by the executive committee. In addition, NCA has standing committees and councils: the Convention Committee, the Nominating Committee, the Leadership Development Committee, the Resolutions Committee, the Teaching and Learning Council, the Finance Committee, the Publications Council, the Research Council, and the Inclusion, Diversity, Equity, and Access Council.  

NCA is composed of 49 divisions, which cover various areas of study; seven sections, which address professional settings; and six caucuses, which represent specific demographic or socially defined segments of the NCA membership. It supports two national student organizations: Lambda Pi Eta (LPH) and Sigma Chi Eta (SCH).

Convention 
NCA sponsors an annual convention on communication research and teaching. The NCA Annual Convention has been held every year since 1915, except for 1918, when it was cancelled because of the U.S. involvement in World War I. The site of the convention changes every year and is determined five to seven years in advance. The convention site rotates among the western, midwestern, and eastern regions of the United States.

Publications
With its publishing partner, Taylor and Francis, NCA publishes 11 academic journals:

 Communication and Critical/Cultural Studies
 Communication Education
 Communication Monographs
 Communication Teacher
 Critical Studies in Media Communication
 First Amendment Studies
 Journal of Applied Communication Research
 Journal of International and Intercultural Communication
 Quarterly Journal of Speech
 Review of Communication
 Text and Performance Quarterly

NCA regularly publishes Communication Currents essays, which summarize recent research published in NCA's journals. In 2020, NCA's quarterly magazine, Spectra, transitioned from a print magazine to an online magazine. Spectra includes summaries of recently published research articles, announcements from the Association, job advertisements, news about members, and news from affiliated organizations. NCA launched Communication Matters: The NCA Podcast in 2020.

See also
American Council of Learned Societies
American Association for the Advancement of Science
National Coalition Against Censorship
ScienceDebate.org

References

External links 

 National Communication Association
 NCA Journals Official Homepage

1914 establishments in the United States
Professional associations based in the United States
Communications and media organizations based in the United States
Academic organizations based in the United States
Organizations established in 1914
Organizations based in Washington, D.C.